Conon is a small but prominent lunar impact crater that lies in the eastern foothills of the Montes Apenninus mountain range. The crater is named for the Greek astronomer Conon of Samos ( 250 BCE). Just to the west of Conon is the long mountainous ridge Mons Bradley.

Description
The edge of Conon's rim is sharply defined and has not received significant erosion from later impacts. The inner wall is somewhat variable in width, and the interior floor forms an irregular oval shape. This irregularity may be due to the rough and uneven surface on which the crater was formed. The floor is rough, but lacks a central prominence of note.

To the south, in the Sinus Fidei, is a sinuous rille that follows a course to the south-southeast. This rille is designated Rima Conon, and is named after this crater.

Satellite craters
By convention these features are identified on lunar maps by placing the letter on the side of the crater midpoint that is closest to Conon.

References

External links

Conon at The Moon Wiki
 LTO-41C1 CononL&PI topographic map

Impact craters on the Moon